Surgenor is a surname. Notable people with this surname include:

 Dorothy Surgenor (born 1931), American alpine skier
Lois Surgenor, New Zealand clinical psychologist and academic
 Ross Surgenor, Canadian racing driver